Tamas Varga (born 17 June 1978, in Budapest) is a Hungarian rower who won the men's lightweight sculls pair event at the 2005 World Rowing Championships with Zsolt Hirling.  He has also competed at three Olympics (2004, 2008 and 2012) also in the men's lightweight sculls event.

References 

 

1978 births
Living people
Hungarian male rowers
Rowers from Budapest
Olympic rowers of Hungary
Rowers at the 2004 Summer Olympics
Rowers at the 2008 Summer Olympics
Rowers at the 2012 Summer Olympics
World Rowing Championships medalists for Hungary
European Rowing Championships medalists